Monsieur is a 1990 comedy film based on the 1986 novel of the same name by Jean-Philippe Toussaint. It was directed by the novel's author and produced by Pascal Judelewicz and Anne-Dominique Toussaint. The film starred Dominic Gould, Wojciech Pszoniak, and Eva Ionesco. Monsieur was screened at the 1990 Toronto International Film Festival. It received the André Cavens Award for Best Film given by the Belgian Film Critics Association (UCC).

Cast 
 Dominic Gould as Monsieur
 Wojciech Pszoniak as Kaltz
 Eva Ionesco as Mrs. Pons-Romanov
 Aziliz Juhel as Anne Bruckhardt
 Jacques Lippe as Parrain
 Jany de Stoppani as Mrs. Parrain
 Alexandra Stewart as Mrs. Dubois-Lacour
 Alexandre von Sivers as Leguen
 Aurelle Doazan as Laurence

References

External links 
 

1990 films
1990 comedy films
Belgian comedy films
French comedy films
1990s French-language films
French-language Belgian films
1990s French films